The Antwerp Symphony Orchestra is the symphony orchestra of Flanders (Belgium), based in the Queen Elisabeth Hall in Antwerp. The orchestra is led by chief conductor Elim Chan and honorary conductor Philippe Herreweghe. The organisation, which is one of the seven art institutions of the Flemish Community, is one of the most important cultural representatives in the region. It is one of only two Belgian orchestras (together with the OPRL in Liège) that have the right to style themselves as "royal", hence its full name "Antwerp Symphony Orchestra - the royal philharmonic orchestra of Flanders".

Since its inception in 1955, the Antwerp Symphony Orchestra’s mission has been to reach the widest possible audience with a classical and contemporary symphonic repertoire. In Belgium, the orchestra performs in its Antwerp home base every season, as well as in East Flanders (Muziekcentrum De Bijloke), West Flanders (Concertgebouw Brugge), Limburg (Cultuurcentrum Hasselt) and Brussels (Bozar/Paleis voor Schone Kunsten/Centre for Fine Arts). As a cultural ambassador of Flanders, the orchestra undertakes international tours in and outside Europe every season.

In addition to its regular concerts, the Antwerp Symphony Orchestra also pays attention to youth work and social projects for people with a disability or from a migrant background. In 2016, the orchestra received the “Iedereen Klassiek” award from Flemish public radio broadcaster Klara for this.

Joost Maegerman has been the orchestra’s intendant/managing director since 2015.

Names 
The orchestra has changed names several times since its inception:

 from April 2017 Antwerp Symphony Orchestra
 from September 2002 Koninklijke Filharmonie van Vlaanderen / Royal Flemish Philharmonic – deFilharmonie for short
 from July 1985 Koninklijk Filharmonisch Orkest van Vlaanderen
 from January 1983 Filharmonisch Orkest van Vlaanderen
 at its foundation in 1955 De Philharmonie van Antwerpen

Origins & history

Origins 
The orchestra is part of a long tradition of philharmonic associations in Antwerp. Its oldest precursor is the Société Royale d’Harmonie d’Anvers (which still operates today under the name Sorodha). This music association, which was founded in 1814, had a large number of members and a very bourgeois, edifying agenda: to promote and develop the moral well-being of Antwerp’s population through classical music.

The Antwerp Symphony Orchestra can trace its roots directly to the Koninklijke Maatschappij voor Dierkunde (KMDA) or Antwerp’s Royal Zoological Society. From its inception in 1843, this society focused on zoology and nature conservation. In 1895, the Koninklijke Maatschappij voor Dierkunde founded an orchestra to give concerts for its members. During the summer, these ‘Dierentuinconcerten’ or Zoo concerts were organised in the Zoo. In the winter months, the orchestra moved to the ‘Grote Feestzaal’ (the Great Festival Hall, the predecessor of the current Queen Elisabeth Hall), which was built in 1897 to host these concerts. Under the baton of Edward Keurvels and later Flor Alpaerts, the programme featured works of composers such as Edvard Grieg, César Franck and Hector Berlioz. Flemish composers such as Waelput, Blockx, Wambach and De Mol also received special attention. 

In 1903, another orchestra was founded in Antwerp: the Maatschappij der Nieuwe Concerten van Antwerpen under the baton of Lodewijk Mortelmans. Guest conductors such as Gustav Mahler, Siegfried Wagner, Hans Richter, Richard Strauss and Sergei Rachmaninoff conducted this orchestra. Soloists such as Pablo de Sarasate, Jacques Thibaud, Pablo Casals and Fritz Kreisler performed under the baton of Mortelmans.

Vzw De Philharmonie (1955 - 1983) 
The orchestras of the Koninklijke Maatschappij voor Dierkunde and of the Maatschappij der Nieuwe Concerten were disbanded after World War II. Many places of civilised entertainment were severely damaged during the war, leaving very few concert halls in the city. In the 1950s, it also proved difficult to put together occasional orchestras and find suitable stages for an orchestra. Moreover, Antwerp had only one professional orchestra, that of the Koninklijke Vlaamse Opera (Royal Flemish Opera), which had a specific role in the orchestra pit.

On 12 November 1955, Gaston Ariën founded De Philharmonie as a non-profit organisation, in collaboration with Jef Maes, J.A. Zwijsen and Steven Candael. On 19 January 1956, rehearsals started. After some fifty meetings, the first concert took place on 10 December 1956 in the opera house.

Finding permanent accommodation proved quite a challenge for the orchestra. The ‘Grote Feestzaal’ of the Royal Zoological Society/Koninklijke Maatschappij voor Dierkunde was the only hall in the city with a sufficiently large stage to accommodate an orchestra. It was demolished in 1958, however, to build the Queen Elisabeth Hall in the same location. That is why De Philharmonie rehearsed in various spaces throughout the city, including the Zoo’s Alpaertszaal/Alpaerts Room and the Olympia sports hall in Zuid (which was later occupied by a night club called Zillion).

In 1959, the Dutchman Eduard Flipse became De Philharmonie’s first chief conductor. During the 1960s, De Philharmonie flourished. In 1960, Queen Elisabeth inaugurated the new hall that would bear her name, the Queen Elisabeth Hall. From then on, the orchestra had a dedicated music venue for its performances. The Flemish public TV broadcaster BRT also regularly called on the orchestra’s services.

In 1970, Flipse retired. Various members of the orchestra served as conductor, starting with Valère Lenaerts, who was succeeded by Enrique Jordá three years later. André Vandernoot was the orchestra’s guest conductor from 1975 until 1983.

From 1980, De Philharmonie joined forces with deSingel, fulfilling the dream of Peter Benoit, the founder of the Koninklijk Vlaams Conservatorium (Royal Conservatoire Antwerp), many decades later. The orchestra finally had a second, full-fledged stage in its hometown. Budget-wise, however, things became increasingly difficult. Flemish Culture Minister, Karel Poma, threatened to disband the orchestra. To this end, an audit was carried out that concluded that a drastic reorganisation was necessary.

De Filharmonie van Vlaanderen (1983 - 1985) 
In response to the findings of the audit report, a new non-profit organisation was founded in 1983 under the name De Filharmonie van Vlaanderen. Emil Tchakarov was appointed as chief conductor and a new board of directors established. Following a change in regulations, the orchestra could now also organise concerts itself.

Koninklijk Filharmonisch Orkest van Vlaanderen (1985 - 2002) 
In 1985, the orchestra’s name changed to Koninklijk Filharmonisch Orkest van Vlaanderen.

In 1987, Günter Neuhold was appointed as the new chief conductor. He focused on works by Flemish contemporary composers such as Luc Brewaeys. In 1996, the orchestra was given a permanent place to rehearse, in the form of a new-build in Antwerp’s Eilandje neighbourhood.

During the 1998-1999 season, Philippe Herreweghe joined the orchestra as artistic director. Since then, he has been permanently affiliated with the orchestra.

deFilharmonie - Royal Flemish Philharmonic (2002 - 2017) 
The growing international interest in the orchestra gave rise to a new name in 2002: deFilharmonie (Royal Flemish Philharmonic). 

In 2008, Jaap van Zweden was appointed as chief conductor, Martyn Brabbins as permanent guest conductor, and Philippe Herreweghe as principal conductor. This created a solid artistic basis for the orchestra. In 2011, Edo de Waart replaced chief conductor Jaap van Zweden. In 2009, the decision was made to build a new Queen Elisabeth Hall, with deFilharmonie as the resident orchestra, after consultation with the Flemish Master Architect and with the support of the Flemish Community.

After three years of renovations, the new Queen Elisabeth Hall was inaugurated by Queen Mathilde in November 2016 in the same location; deFilharmonie performed four inaugural concerts in the new centre. Since then, the orchestra has rehearsed, performed, and made recordings in the Queen Elisabeth Hall.

Antwerp Symphony Orchestra (2017 - …) 
The new concert hall, with international allure, prompted another name change. On 3 April 2017, the orchestra changed its name to Antwerp Symphony Orchestra. As the residence orchestra of the Queen Elisabeth Hall, Antwerp Symphony is one of three musical institutions (the others being the Queen Elisabeth Competition and the Queen Elisabeth Music Chapel) dedicated to the former Queen. 

Since the 2017-2018 season, the Antwerp Symphony Orchestra has been hosting international orchestras in the Queen Elisabeth Hall every season, in collaboration with deSingel.

At the start of the 2019-2020 concert season, Elim Chan became the new chief conductor of the Antwerp Symphony Orchestra. The conductor was just 31 years old when she accepted the position, making her the youngest chief conductor in the orchestra’s history.

Concerts

Locations 
In addition to its concerts in the Queen Elisabeth Hall, the orchestra also performs in other locations in Antwerp every season, such as deSingel, De Roma, AMUZ, St. Charles Borromeo Church, the Cathedral of Our Lady and Sint-Jansplein. Concert halls such as the Centre for Fine Arts in Brussels, the Concertgebouw in Bruges, Muziekcentrum De Bijloke in Ghent and CCHA in Hasselt are other music venues where the orchestra performs.

As a Cultural Ambassador of Flanders, the Antwerp Symphony Orchestra has already performed in foreign concert halls, such as the Philharmonic Hall in Saint Petersburg, the National Grand Theatre in Beijing, the Musikverein and the Konzerthaus in Vienna, the Koninklijk Concertgebouw in Amsterdam, Suntory Hall and Bunka Kaikan Hall in Tokyo and the Palace of Art in Budapest. In April 2019, the Antwerp Symphony Orchestra became the first Flemish orchestra ever to tour Latin America, with concerts in Teatro Mayor in Bogotá (Colombia) and Sala São Paulo São Paulo (Brazil).

Traditions 
The Antwerp Symphony Orchestra has a number of traditions, namely a number of (annually) recurring concerts.

Every year, the Antwerp Symphony Orchestra gives a cathedral concert in Antwerp’s Cathedral of Our Lady, Christmas concerts in St. Charles Borromeo Church and a New Year’s concert in the Queen Elisabeth Hall. In addition, the orchestra has been performing an accessible classical music programme for more than ten years during its open-air concert in Antwerp’s Sint-Jansplein during the first weekend of September.

Recordings 
The Antwerp Symphony Orchestra makes recordings for such renowned classical labels as PHI, BIS Records and PentaTone Classics.

Education & outreach 
Education & Outreach groups a multitude of initiatives, with which the Antwerp Symphony Orchestra fulfils a social and educational mission. The orchestra develops a durable cultural experience, enabling children, young people, and people in vulnerable positions and from diverse cultural backgrounds to participate in classical music. These types of projects, which specifically target children and young people, are a common thread throughout the Antwerp Symphony Orchestra’s existence.

As an institution, the Antwerp Symphony Orchestra is the driving force behind several youth orchestras (the Re-Mix Orchestra founded in 2007, the Antwerps Jeugdorkest founded in 2018 and the Youth Orchestra Flanders founded in 2018). The orchestra also founded the Antwerp Symphony Orchestra Academy in 2018. It also participates in the biennial SoundMine composition internship of Musica.

Leadership

Chief conductors 

 2019 - present Elim Chan
 2011 - 2016 Edo de Waart
 2008 - 2011 Jaap van Zweden
 2002 - 2008 Daniele Callegari
 1998 Philippe Herreweghe (permanently affiliated to the Antwerp Symphony Orchestra since 1998)
 1995 - 1998 Grant Llewellyn
 1991 - 1995 Muhai Tang
 1986 - 1991 Günter Neuhold
 1983 - 1986 Emil Tchakarov
 1975 - 1983 André Vandernoot
 1970 - 1975 Enrique Jordá
 1959 - 1970 Eduard Flipse

Intendants/Managing Directors 

 2015 - present Joost Maegerman
 2009 - 2015 Hans Verbugt
 2009 Jean Pierre Grootaers
 2004 - 2008 Hans Waege
 2000 - 2004 Jan Raes
 1993 - 2000 Luc Vanackere
 1991 - 1992 Marc Anseeuw
 1986 - 1991 Luc Vanackere
 1984 - 1986 Marc Clémeur
 1964 - 1983 François Cuvelier

Discography (selection) 

 Bert Joris: Dangerous Liaison (together with the Brussels Jazz Orchestra)
 Claude Debussy / Luc Brewaeys: Preludes - Recomposition for symphony orchestra, conducted by Daniele Callegari (2005)
 Ludwig van Beethoven: Symphony No. 4 in B Flat Major, Op. 60 & Symphony No. 7 in A major, Op. 92, conducted by Philippe Herreweghe (2005)
 Maurice Ravel - orchestrations: Mussorgsky – Debussy – Chabrier - Schumann
 Giya Kancheli: Simi (for cello and orchestra) & Magnum Ignotum (for a wind ensemble)
 Kalevi Aho: Trombone & Trumpet Concertos, conducted by Martyn Brabbins
 Antonín Dvořák: Concerto for Violin and Orchestra in A minor, Op. 53 / Suk: Fantasy in G minor, Op. 24 and Love Song, Op. 7, conducted by Alan Buribayev
 Wilhelm Stenhammar: Symphony No.2, conducted by Christian Lindberg
 Robert Schumann: Symphony No. 2 and 4, conducted by Philippe Herreweghe

In addition to this small selection, the Antwerp Symphony Orchestra (deFilharmonie, Royal Flemish Philharmonic, Koninklijk Vlaams Filharmonisch Orkest) has made several recordings of works by Belgian composers, such as Peter Benoit, August De Boeck, Josef Callaerts, Wim Henderickx, Luc Van Hove, Joseph Jongen, Jef Maes, Arthur Meulemans, Lodewijk Mortelmans, Norbert Rosseau, Adolphe Samuel, Henri Vieuxtemps and Eugène Ysaÿe, often under the baton of conductor Martyn Brabbins.

Sources 
 Jan de Zutter, Jan Dewilde, Tom Eelen: Van de Philharmonie tot deFilharmonie, Antwerp, 2005, 287 p.

External links

J.B. van Benthem, Instituut voor Nederlandse Geschiedenis, Dutch-language online biography of Eduard Flipse

References

Belgian orchestras
Musical groups established in 1956
1956 establishments in Belgium